The Alliance, also known as Team WCW/ECW and The Coalition, was a villainous professional wrestling stable in the World Wrestling Federation (WWF, now WWE) that existed during the Invasion storyline from July to November 2001.

The stable came about as a result of the WWF's purchase of World Championship Wrestling (WCW) in March 2001. The Extreme Championship Wrestling (ECW) name was brought in later to help boost the presence of WCW after the original promotion closed in April 2001.

History 

The original plan was for the WWF-owned WCW to be a babyface group, led by Shane McMahon (who was the owner of WCW in the angle) to go against the heel owner of the WWF, Mr. McMahon. During May and June 2001, wrestlers identified as being "under contract to WCW" (such as Lance Storm and Mike Awesome) "invaded" WWF programming, by making several run-ins. The ultimate goal, reportedly, was for WCW to "take over" WWF's flagship show Raw Is War and rebrand it as its own television program, while the WWF would retain control of SmackDown! as their own show. To test the waters for this, the final twenty minutes of the July 2 edition of Raw Is War was given over to WCW, which brought in its own commentators (Scott Hudson and Arn Anderson), ring announcer (Stacy Keibler), referee (Nick Patrick), ring apron, and Chyron graphics, to present a match between Booker T and Buff Bagwell for Booker's WCW Championship (which he had won on the final episode of Nitro). This continued later that week on SmackDown!, where Gregory Helms lost the WCW Cruiserweight Championship against Billy Kidman and Booker defended the WCW Championship against Diamond Dallas Page.

The Booker/Bagwell title match, however, was very poorly received both by television viewers and the live crowd in the arena; sports journalist Michael Landsberg reported that many have called the bout "the worst match ever". The two other WCW matches also received a negative fan reaction. The decision was thus made to make WCW a heel group who was out to destroy the WWF. On the July 9 episode of Raw Is War, when then-face WCW owner Shane was scheduled to face Page in a street fight, the two instead attacked The Undertaker, turning Shane heel (Page had already debuted in WWF as a heel, as part of a stalker angle with Undertaker and his wife).

Later that night, during a tag team match pitting Chris Jericho and Kane against WCW's Lance Storm and Mike Awesome, former Extreme Championship Wrestling (ECW) stars Rob Van Dam and Tommy Dreamer interfered and attacked Jericho and Kane. Justin Credible, Raven, Tazz, Rhyno, and The Dudley Boyz (all ECW Alumni) came to the ring shortly thereafter and joined Van Dam and Dreamer in attacking Jericho and Kane, and Raw Is War color commentator Paul Heyman announced that together, he was forming an ECW team to take on the feuding WWF and WCW factions.

Later that evening, Vince and Shane agreed to pit aside their differences and join forces to take out ECW once and for all in a twenty-man brawl between Team WWF (Hardcore Holly, Big Show, APA, and Billy Gunn) and Team WCW (Chris Kanyon, Chuck Palumbo, Sean O'Haire, Shawn Stasiak, and Mark Jindrak). When WCW and ECW faced off in the ring, however, they instead congratulated each other and attacked the WWF wrestlers. It was revealed that ECW had merged with WCW to form a "supergroup" to more effectively challenge the WWF and that Stephanie McMahon had purchased the defunct company. This combined group was originally referred to as "WECW" on WCW.com and then as "WCW/ECW," but the rights to ECW's assets (including the use of its name on-air by the WWF) were still being debated in bankruptcy court at that time, so the name of the group was shortened to The Alliance.

At WWF Invasion, Team WCW/ECW (Booker T, Diamond Dallas Page, Rhyno, and The Dudley Boyz) defeated Team WWF (Stone Cold Steve Austin, The Undertaker, Kane, Kurt Angle, and Chris Jericho) in a ten-man tag team match billed as the "Inaugural Brawl". During the match, Austin turned on the WWF and joined The Alliance, helping them score the victory, after about a week of teasing a face turn.

Over the next few months, the two sides fought back and forth. Except for a few wrestlers (X-Factor and Christian, for example), every feud was a WWF wrestler versus an Alliance wrestler. Ten combined WWF and WCW championships were defended among all the wrestlers in the various feuds. Over time, numerous WWF superstars would defect to the Alliance, including Test, William Regal, Ivory, and Christian. Former ECW and WCW wrestler Steven Richards would belatedly defect to the Alliance, bringing WCW alumni KroniK with him. In return, Chuck Palumbo and Torrie Wilson defected from The Alliance to the WWF. Kurt Angle also defected to the Alliance on the October 29 episode of Raw.

In late October, both sides agreed to end things once and for all. A "Winner Take All" classic Survivor Series elimination tag team match was set for the Survivor Series pay-per-view, with the losing company going out of business forever. In addition, two title unification matches were signed, as the WCW World Tag Team Championship and the WWF Tag Team Championship were to be unified in a match between The Dudley Boyz and The Hardy Boyz, while Edge and Test would meet in a match to unify Edge's WCW United States Championship with Test's WWF Intercontinental Championship. Further, 20 WWF and Alliance members would square off in what was called the "Immunity Battle Royal", with the winner of the match keeping his job for one year regardless of whether his side won or not.

In the end, Team WWF (The Rock, Chris Jericho, The Undertaker, Kane, and Big Show) defeated Team Alliance (Stone Cold Steve Austin, Kurt Angle, Rob Van Dam, Booker T, and Shane McMahon) when Angle double-crossed The Alliance by turning on Austin while he was fighting The Rock during the closing stages of the match. The Rock then pinned Austin, not only putting The Alliance out of business, but also being a symbolic victory of WWF's dominance over its former rivals. Earlier in the night, The Dudley Boyz defeated The Hardy Boyz to unify the tag team championships while Edge defeated Test to win the Intercontinental Championship. Despite his loss, Test entered the Immunity Battle Royal later that night and won.

With The Alliance's loss, nearly all of their members lost their jobs following the match. Exceptions were made for Stone Cold Steve Austin, then-WWF Champion; The Dudley Boyz, who won the WWF Tag Team Championship; Stacy Keibler, the Dudleys' manager; Rob Van Dam, who at the time was the Hardcore Champion; Christian, who at the time was the European Champion; Immunity Battle Royal winner Test; and Alliance Commissioner William Regal, who was forced to join the "Mr. McMahon Kiss My Ass Club" to keep his job. Some of them would be hired back over the next few months, with the majority of them returning when the brand extension began. The WWF Light Heavyweight Championship, which was held at the time by X-Pac, was quietly retired and replaced with WCW's Cruiserweight Championship.

The next night on Raw, Mr. McMahon celebrated his victory by making a slow return to his villain character, aligning himself with The Alliance members that were sticking around. Later that night, he resumed his rivalry with Austin, who turned face by attacking Angle and aligning himself with a returning Ric Flair, who was revealed, in storyline, bought Shane and Stephanie's stock in the company prior to Survivor Series, making him the new co-owner of the WWF, along with McMahon. After being "fired", Shane walked out on his own and congratulated his father for his victory, and spent most of the next eighteen months away from television; he would return to feud with Kane in 2003. Stephanie blamed Shane for everything and was escorted out of the arena by security, but unlike Shane she made a quick return and began appearing again shortly after the return of her then on-screen husband Triple H in January, which led to a three-month-long feud that ended shortly after WrestleMania X8.

One of the more important changes was the removal of the WCW branding from The Rock's then World Championship. Co-Owners McMahon and Flair decided that, since there were two world championships in the company, a tournament would be set up at Vengeance in December to crown an Undisputed WWF Champion. Current WWF Champion Stone Cold Austin was to take on Kurt Angle while World Champion The Rock was to take on Chris Jericho, with the winners then facing off to become the first UndisputedChampion. Jericho, who had been feuding with The Rock over the WCW Championship dating all the way back to October. won the World title while Austin defeated Angle to retain his WWF Championship. Jericho, thanks to a returning Booker T, defeated Austin to become the first Undisputed WWF Champion.

Members

Championships and accomplishments 
 World Wrestling Federation
 WCW Championship (2 times) – Booker T
 WCW Cruiserweight Championship (3 times) – Gregory Helms (1) and Billy Kidman (2)
 WCW United States Championship (4 times) – Booker T (1), Chris Kanyon (1), Rhyno (1), and Kurt Angle (1)
 WCW Tag Team Championship (3 times) – Chuck Palumbo and Sean O'Haire (1), Booker T and Test (1), and The Dudley Boyz (1)
 WWF Championship (2 times) – Stone Cold Steve Austin
 WWF European Championship (2 times) – The Hurricane (1) and Christian (1)
 WWF Hardcore Championship (4 times) – Mike Awesome (1) and Rob Van Dam (3)
 WWF Intercontinental Championship (3 times) – Lance Storm (1), Christian (1), and Test (1)
 WWF Tag Team Championship (4 times) – The Dudley Boyz (2), Diamond Dallas Page and Chris Kanyon (1), and Booker T and Test (1)

See also 
 The Invasion (the storyline)
 Survivor Series (2001)
 The Authority

References 

Extreme Championship Wrestling teams and stables
World Championship Wrestling teams and stables
WWE teams and stables